Kamarai Joshua Simon-Swyer (born 4 December 2002) is an English professional footballer who plays as an attacking midfielder for Premier League club West Ham United.

Career
Simon-Swyer joined West Ham United at the age of eight. On his 18th birthday, Simon-Swyer signed his first professional contract with West Ham. Simon-Swyer's first involvement in West Ham's first team came in a 1–0 defeat against Dinamo Zagreb, where he was an unused substitute in a UEFA Europa League tie on 9 December 2021. On 3 November 2022, Simon-Swyer made his debut for West Ham in a 3–0 UEFA Europa Conference League win against Romanian club FCSB coming on as a 77th minute substitute for Divin Mubama.

References

2002 births
Living people
English footballers
Footballers from the London Borough of Redbridge
Association football midfielders
West Ham United F.C. players
Black British sportsmen